Lehman Hot Springs is a hot springs resort in Oregon. The hot springs were first used by Native Americans before being discovered by pioneer settlers. Lehman Hot Springs was founded as a resort in 1871.

The family that owned Lehman for most of the 1900s repurchased the property in 2012, along with many facilities problems. After extensive renovations Lehman Hot Springs is operating as a limited use facility for private organizations.  It is not open to the public for daily swims.  Lehman Hot Springs is the largest collection of natural hot spring pools in the Northwest.

Pendleton, Oregon photographer Walter S. Bowman captured images of bathers at the hot springs during the early 20th century including partygoers at a masquerade party.

History

The springs closed in 1975. In 1982 a renovation and redevelopment plan was launched.

TSL Foundation, LLC purchased Lehman Hot Springs on July 19, 2012 and The Department of Environmental Quality removed the prior restrictions resulting from actions related to Patrick Lucas.

In 2013 Umatilla County Health Department licensed Lehman Hot Springs as a Limited Use pool and facility.

References

External links
Lehman Hot Springs Official Web Site

Hot springs of Oregon
Bodies of water of Umatilla County, Oregon